Peter Whiteley may refer to

 Peter Whiteley (Royal Marines officer) (1920–2016), UK military officer, Lieutenant Governor of Jersey
 Peter Whiteley (cricketer, born 1935) (1935–1989), English cricketer
 Peter Whiteley (cricketer, born 1955) (born 1955), English cricketer
 Peter Whiteley Jr., fictitious character in UK series Emmerdale